Mirage was a heavy metal band which was formed in 1983 from the ashes of two Welsh Rock/ Metal bands: 'Rough Justice' and 'Exit'. The band were based in the valleys of South East Wales, UK. Its members were Richard Morgan  (aka "Wretch) on vocals, Richard Price on guitar, Carl Skinner on bass and Gerry Turner on drums. In 1984, they released one track 'Blind Fury' on a compilation album produced by local record company 'Notepad Productions'. This came to the attention of Malc Macmillan, author of the Encyclopaedia of New Wave of British Heavy Metal (NWoBHM) who described their track 'Blind Fury' as "truly one of the classic tracks of the entire NWoBHM genre" The rare Notepad Productions VOLUME I album remains highly sought after by collectors - featured in Record Collector Magazine in  January 2015. The band has enjoyed some recent attention from High Roller Records who have re-released the band's tracks Blind Fury/ Twilight Zone on black and white vinyl. The cover features Richard Price's original 1979 Fender Stratocaster guitar alongside a Turner family artefact from World War II.

References

British heavy metal musical groups